Angus Walter Kerr (May 24, 1873May 30, 1927) was an American politician and lawyer.

Early life and education
Kerr was born in Ontario, Canada on May 24, 1873. Kerr moved to Lake Linden, Michigan when he was a child. There, he received a high school education. Kerr then attended the University of Michigan Law School from 1891 to 1892.

Career
At the end of his law education, Kerr entered the law office of A. T. Streeter in Calumet, Michigan. Kerr was admitted to the bar on July 12, 1895. Kerr went on to serve as the city attorney of Calumet and as the circuit court commissioner for Houghton County. In 1901, Albert Edward Petermann entered Kerr's law office. He would work there until 1911. Petermann who would go on to serve in the Michigan House of Representatives in 1917. Kerr served in the Spanish American War, in Company D of the 34th Michigan Volunteer Regiment. Then, he was mustered out, where he was assigned recruiting duty. On November 8, 1898, Kerr was elected to the Michigan House of Representatives where he represented the Houghton County 1st district from January 1, 1899, to January 1, 1903. Kerr served as Houghton County prosecuting attorney from 1905 to 1908. Kerr served as chief counsel of the Western Federation of Miners during the Great Copper Country strike.

Kerr later moved to Springfield, Illinois where he served as a member of the judiciary. In Illinois, in 1914, he served as the chief counsel of the United Mine Workers. In this position, he helped the passage of the Illinois Workers' Compensation Act. He had also served as Assistant Attorney General.

Personal life
Angus W. Kerr was married to Katherine. Kathrine survived Angus, and so did two of their children.

Death
On May 30, 1927, Kerr died in Springfield, Illinois, following an operation. At the time of his death, he was serving on the Illinois Crime Commission.

References

1873 births
1927 deaths
American military personnel of the Spanish–American War
Canadian emigrants to the United States
Illinois lawyers
Illinois Republicans
Michigan lawyers
Michigan Republicans
Military personnel from Michigan
People from Calumet, Michigan
People from Ontario
People from Springfield, Illinois
University of Michigan Law School alumni
20th-century American judges
19th-century American lawyers
20th-century American lawyers
20th-century American politicians